Ion Pistol (1 December 1946 – 12 May 1987) was the last person put to death in Romania (then the Socialist Republic of Romania) prior to the execution of Nicolae and Elena Ceaușescu. He was tried for murder on 9 April 1986, before a 500-person auditorium. His lawyer, Liviu Ardeiaș, claimed that sentencing him to death would result "not in execution, but in murder". The same day, the Teleorman County tribunal handed down a death sentence. On 4 May 1987, Ceaușescu rejected his plea for clemency. Eight days later, he was executed by shooting at a prison in the Bucharest area.

According to Pistol's penal file, he was born in the commune of Trivalea-Moșteni, where he was living at the time of his arrest, and had a fourth-grade education. The report indicates he killed his mother Gheorgița with multiple axe blows on the night of 30–31 October 1985 and was arrested on 1 November 1985. He was taken to the prison of Jilava prior to his execution and asked for an onion omelette for his last meal.

See also
 Trial and execution of Nicolae and Elena Ceaușescu
 List of people executed in Romania

References

1946 births
1987 deaths
People from Teleorman County
Matricides
Romanian people convicted of murder
People executed by the Socialist Republic of Romania
People executed by Romania by firing squad
People executed for murder
People convicted of murder by Romania
Executed Romanian people